The 1980 National League was contested as the second division of Speedway in the United Kingdom.

Summary
The league was increased from 19 teams to 20 from the previous season. Exeter Falcons dropped down from the British League to join the 19 incumbent sides.

Rye House Rockets who had been pipped to the title in the previous season in the last meeting, won the title by just one point from Newcastle Diamonds to win their first National League title. Rye House had managed to retain all of their top riders from the previous season and the solid performances of Bob Garrad, Karl Fiala, Kelvin Mullarkey and Kevin Smith for the second year running made up for the disappointment of 1979. Newcastle's second place finish was remarkable bearing in mind that they had lost the league's leading rider Tom Owen to Hull Vikings in the highest division. Despite signing 1979 Riders' champion Ian Gledhill, the defending champions Mildenhall suffered after losing Melvyn Taylor and Mick Hines to other teams.

Final table

 Crayford v Weymouth fixture was never ridden.

National League Knockout Cup
The 1980 National League Knockout Cup was the 13th edition of the Knockout Cup for tier two teams. Berwick Bandits were the winners of the competition for the first time, having been runners-up three times in the previous four seasons.

First round

Second round

Quarter-finals

Semi-finals

Final
First leg

Second leg

Berwick were declared Knockout Cup Champions, winning on aggregate 79–76.

Leading final averages

Riders & final averages
Berwick

Wayne Brown 9.49 
Steve McDermott 9.06
Mike Fullerton 7.63
Roger Wright 7.43
Nigel Close 7.32 
Graham Jones 6.36
Mike Caroline 5.71
Brett Saunders 5.57
Rob Grant Sr. 5.41 

Boston

David Gagen 9.80
Gary Guglielmi 9.33
Rob Hollingworth 8.57 
Steve Lomas 8.10
Dennis Mallett 7.09
Chris Turner 6.87
Tony Featherstone 6.19
Michael Holding 4.52
Ian Turner 4.49
Mike Spinks 4.04
Chris Cole 2.24

Canterbury

Mike Ferreira 10.32
Barney Kennett 7.90
Ted Hubbard 7.66
Denzil Kent 6.64
Dave Piddock 4.83
Kevin Brice 3.65
Rob Dolman 3.42
Tony Reynolds 2.77
Kevin Howland 2.22
Simon Franks 1.25

Crayford

Paul Woods 10.47
Steve Naylor 8.02
Alan Sage 6.89
Laurie Etheridge 6.00
Mike Pither 5.30
Alan Johns 5.12
Paul Gilbert 3.68

Edinburgh

George Hunter 8.88 
Dave Trownson 8.40
Neil Collins 8.13
Brian Collins 6.09
Benny Rourke 5.97
Harry MacLean 5.18
Roger Lambert 5.13
Arnold Haley 4.76

Ellesmere Port

Steve Finch 9.92
Louis Carr 8.57
John Jackson 8.46
Eric Monaghan 5.24
John Williams 5.23
Phil Alderman 5.16
Pete Ellams 5.03
Peter Carr 4.70
Paul Embley 4.13

Exeter

Rob Maxfield 9.09
Nigel Boocock 8.64 
John Barker 8.50 
Martin Hewlett 6.39 
John Williams 6.26
Arnold Haley 5.83
Tony Garard 5.76
Dave Brewer 4.17
Tony Sanford 3.92
Phil Vance 1.78

Glasgow

Steve Lawson 10.17
Alan Emerson 8.72
Andy Reid 8.02
Jim Beaton 5.84
Charlie McKinna 5.61 
Kenny McKinna 5.36 
Colin Caffrey 5.08
Ray Palmer 4.89
Andy Campbell 2.83
Steve Mildoon 1.75

Middlesbrough

Steve Wilcock 10.28 
Mark Courtney 9.18 
Brian Havelock 7.71
Mike Spink 7.48 
Geoff Pusey 6.98 
Martin Dixon 6.68 
Bernie Collier 4.35

Mildenhall

Ray Bales 8.97
Robert Henry 8.64
Mick Bates 7.60
Ian Gledhill 7.04
Richard Knight 6.19
Andy Warne 5.33
Mark Bilner 5.24
Carl Baldwin 4.47
Mark Baldwin 4.47

Milton Keynes

Bob Humphreys 8.81
Graham Plant 6.34
Nigel Sparshott 6.06
Andy Hibbs 5.96
Bert Harkins 5.86
Mick Blaynee 5.66
Barry Allaway 4.63
Nigel Davis 4.39
Graham Clifton 3.56
Robbie Vigus 3.79
Steve Payne 2.17

Newcastle

Rod Hunter 9.28
Robbie Blackadder 8.54
David Bargh 8.32 
Derek Richardson 7.61
Nigel Crabtree 6.50 
Keith Bloxsome 6.4
Paul Brown 2.82

Nottingham

Mike Sampson 9.88
Ivan Blacka 7.85
Glenn MacDonald 7.56
Craig Featherby 7.45 
Mark Collins 5.37
Arthur Price 4.84
Steve Sant 3.62
Mark Williams 3.60
Pete Bacon 3.43
John Homer 2.98

Oxford

Dave Perks 10.82 
Derek Harrison 8.75 
Bruce Cribb 7.42
John Hack 6.87
Colin Ackroyd 5.62
Steve Crockett 4.68
Mick Fletcher 4.36
Kevin Bowen 4.29
Mick Handley 4.00
John Grahame 3.91
Andy Passey 1.52

Peterborough

Andy Hines 8.81
Nigel Flatman 8.73
Richard Greer 8.19
Mick Hines 7.66
Adrian Pepper 4.59
Andy Fisher 4.57
Nigel Couzens 4.41
Andy Buck 4.32
Ian Barney 1.58

Rye House

Bobby Garrad 9.85 
Karl Fiala 9.45 
Kelvin Mullarkey 9.29 
Kevin Smith 8.43
Ashley Pullen 6.84 
Peter Tarrant 5.78
Andy Fines 4.07
Carl Squirrell 3.03
Barry King 2.40

Scunthorpe

Phil White 9.07 
Arthur Browning 8.59
Nicky Allott 7.08
Kevin Teager 5.31
Rob Woffinden 4.03
John Priest 4.00
Ian Jeffcoate 3.94
Ian Westwell 3.88
Graham Mortimer 2.96

Stoke

Billy Burton 8.02
Tony Boyle 7.26
Paul Stead 6.47
Les Sawyer 5.99
Alan MacLean 5.70
Neil Evitts 4.78
Ian Robertson 4.64
Rod North 4.58
Mike Wilding 3.86
Rob Lightfoot 3.34

Weymouth

Martin Yeates 9.30
Brian Woodward 7.68
Simon Wigg 6.60
Bob Coles 6.25
Chris Pusey 5.94
Malcolm Corradine 5.50
Mark DeKok 4.93
Terry Tulloch 4.22
Geoff Swindells 2.78

Workington

Ian Hindle 6.65
Ian Robertson 5.16
Steve Regeling 4.51
Des Wilson 4.51
Wayne Jackson 4.43
Mark Dickinson 4.06
Terry Kelly 3.68
Chris Roynon 3.50
Kevin Clapham 3.45
Andy Margarson 2.76

See also
List of United Kingdom Speedway League Champions
Knockout Cup (speedway)

References

Speedway British League Division Two / National League